The 2018–19 LNH Division 1 is the 67th season of the LNH Division 1, French premier handball league and the 42st season consisting of only one league. It runs from 5 September 2018 to 5 June 2019.

Team information 

The following 14 clubs compete in the LNH Division 1 during the 2018–19 season:

League table

External links
LNH site

Handball leagues in France
2018–19 domestic handball leagues